Vasilios Golias (Greek: Βασίλειος Γκόλιας; born 4 June 1985) is a professional footballer who currently plays for Nafpaktiakos Asteras as a left back.

Career
On 29 January 2019 it was announced, that Golias had joined Nafpaktiakos Asteras.

References

External links
Profile at Onsports.gr

1985 births
Living people
Greek footballers
Apollon Smyrnis F.C. players
Asteras Tripolis F.C. players
Panetolikos F.C. players
AEL Kalloni F.C. players
Trikala F.C. players
Association football defenders
Footballers from Ioannina